Nancy Bonvillain is a professor of anthropology and linguistics at Bard College at Simon's Rock.  She is author of over twenty books on language, culture, and gender, including a series on Native American peoples.  In her field work she studied the Mohawk and Navajo, and she has published a grammar and dictionary of the Akwesasne dialect of Mohawk.  She received her PhD from Columbia University in 1972 and has taught at Columbia University, The New School, SUNY Purchase, Stony Brook University, and Sarah Lawrence College. She now teaches at Bard College at Simon's Rock.

Selected publications

References

External links
 Simon's Rock Faculty Page

Columbia University alumni
Bard College faculty
Sarah Lawrence College faculty
State University of New York faculty
Columbia University faculty
Living people
Year of birth missing (living people)
Bard College at Simon's Rock faculty